Rincon or Rincón (Spanish for corner) may refer to:

 Rincon (meadow)
 Rincon (abandoned meander)

People
 Rincon (surname)
 Rincón (footballer, born 1977), born Gilvan Santos Souza, Brazilian football striker
 Rincón (footballer, 1980-2013), born Claudiney Ramos, Equatoguinean football defensive midfielder
 Rincón (footballer, born 1987), born Carlos Eduardo de Castro Lourenço, Brazilian football centre-back
 Rincon (footballer, born 1994), born Rincon Teixeira da Rocha, Brazilian football forward

Places

South America and Caribbean
Argentina
 Rincón (Catamarca), Argentine town in Catamarca Province
 Rincón de Los Sauces, Argentine town in Neuquén Province
 Rincón (Córdoba), Argentine town in Córdoba Province
Bonaire
 Rincon, Bonaire, one of only two towns on the island of Bonaire
Costa Rica
 Rincón de Sabanilla, district in San Pablo canton
Dominican Republic
 Rincón, municipal district in La Vega Province
Falkland Islands
 Rincon Grande, East Falkland
Panama
Rincón, Chiriquí
Puerto Rico 
Rincón, Puerto Rico, a municipality
 Rincón, Cayey, Puerto Rico, a barrio 
 Rincón, Cidra, Puerto Rico, a barrio 
 Rincón, Gurabo, Puerto Rico, a barrio
 Rincón, Sabana Grande, Puerto Rico, a barrio
 Rincón barrio-pueblo, a barrio of Ríncon, a municipality of Puerto Rico

North America
Mexico
 Rincón de Romos, Mexican town in Aguascalientes

United States
 Rincon de los Esteros, a Mexican land grant in the present Santa Clara County, California
 Rincon, California, an Indian Reservation located on the East end of Valley Center, California
 Rincon Hill, San Francisco, California, a neighborhood and landform
 Rincon, Georgia, a city
 Rincon Mountains, a mountain range in Arizona
 Rincon, New Mexico, a census-designated place in Doña Ana County, New Mexico
 Rincon, Riverside County, California the name applied to a tract of land lying on either side of the Santa Ana River, from ten to twenty miles below Riverside, California.  A settlement along the river at its crossing point, later renamed Prado, now a ghost town.
 Rancho El Rincon (Arellanes), a 4,460-acre (18.0 km2) Mexican land grant in present day Santa Barbara County and Ventura County, California
 Rincon (surfspot), at the beach along Rincon Point located at the Ventura / Santa Barbara County line on the Pacific Coast of California, USA
 Rincon Parkway, the portion of California State Route 1 along the north coast of Ventura County, California
 Rincon Island (California), artificial island located off Mussel Shoals (also called "Little Rincon") in Ventura County, California, constructed in 1958 for oil and gas production
 Rincon Point (Santa Barbara County), a cape on the Santa Barbara Channel at the boundary between Santa Barbara County and Ventura County
 Rincon Creek (Southern California), a creek that marks the boundary between Santa Barbara and Ventura County, California
 Rincon Formation, a sedimentary geologic unit of Lower Miocene age, abundant in the coastal portions of southern Santa Barbara County, California eastward into Ventura County. 
 Rincon Oil Field, a large oil field on the coast of southern California, about 10 miles (16 km) northwest of the city of Ventura

Africa
 Rincón (Morocco), Mediterranean town in Morocco between Tangier and Tétouan

Europe
Spain
 Rincón de la Victoria, municipality in the Málaga province, Andalusia
 CD Rincón, a football club located in the city
 Rincón de Soto, village in the La Rioja community

Other
 Honda Rincon, all-terrain vehicle (ATV) made by Honda from 2003-present
 Rincon, the development code-name of Microsoft's Internet Explorer 7
 Rincon, a mountain bike made by Giant Bicycles
 Rincon Sea Level Road, roadway built in 1913 using wooden causeways on the coast between Ventura and Santa Barbara, California
 One Rincon Hill, two residential skyscrapers in San Francisco, California, including the tallest U.S. residential skyscraper west of the Mississippi River
 Rincon 1, a satellite built at the University of Arizona